Sangaris luteonotata is a species of beetle in the family Cerambycidae. It was described by Monné and Monné in 2009. It is known from Ecuador.

References

luteonotata
Beetles described in 2009